Men of the Night is a 1926 silent crime film directed by Albert S. Rogell and starring Herbert Rawlinson. It was produced and distributed by independent company Sterling Pictures.

Cast
Herbert Rawlinson as J. Rupert Dodds
Gareth Hughes as Dick Foster
Wanda Hawley as Trixie Moran
Lucy Beaumont as Mrs. Abbott
Jay Hunt as Thomas Bogen
Mathilde Brundage as Lady Broderick

Preservation status
A copy is preserved in the Library of Congress collection.

References

External links
Men of the Night at IMDb.com

1926 films
American silent feature films
Films directed by Albert S. Rogell
American black-and-white films
American crime films
1926 crime films
1920s American films